Al-Badr may refer to:

Groups / organisations
 Al-Badr (Jammu and Kashmir), an organization active in Kashmir, India
 Al-Badr (East Pakistan), a pro-Pakistani militia in the 1971 Bangladesh Liberation War

Places
Al Badr, Saudi Arabia, a village in Makkah Province, in western Saudi Arabia

See also
Badr
Badir